Vlaar is a surname. Notable people with the surname include:

Ron Vlaar (born 1985), Dutch footballer
Alex Vlaar (born 1996), Bulgarian badminton player